The Bona Allen Shoe and Horse Collar Factory, is a historic business location in Buford, Georgia. It was added to the National Register of Historic Places on January 3, 2005. It is located at 554 West Main Street.

It was the main factory building of the Bona Allen Company.

See also
National Register of Historic Places listings in Gwinnett County, Georgia

References

Tanneries
National Register of Historic Places in Gwinnett County, Georgia
Buildings and structures completed in 1905
Buford, Georgia
1905 establishments in Georgia (U.S. state)